Worth the Risk? is a 1948 British public information film highlighting the importance of road safety. It was produced by the Crown Film Unit and funded by the Ministry of Transport.

Synopsis
The film opens at an emergency telephone exchange, which receives a request for an ambulance once every 3½ minutes. A call is placed about a road traffic accident on Shoreditch Road. An ambulance is dispatched to the scene of the incident.

A series of scenes illustrate careless behaviour that could lead to road accidents. This includes a boy running out into the road in front of a car, a drunk man behind the wheel who nearly knocks over a pedestrian, and a cyclist with faulty brakes who runs into the back of a lorry.

Two further stories are shown. Mr Smith is driving to work along a familiar route, cutting corners to save time. On one morning, he almost has a collision with a lorry when going around a bend. Miss Jones is a pedestrian who pays little attention to oncoming traffic, assuming that vehicles will always stop to allow her to cross. One day, she is fatally hit by a driver whose brakes are faulty.

A man is shown leaving a cinema in which he has been watching the road safety film. He has paid little attention to the film, assuming that "accidents only happen to other people". As the walks out into the road, the screen cuts to a view of a "Get Home Safe and Sound" poster, accompanied by the sound of screeching brakes.

Reception
The Monthly Film Bulletin, the journal of the British Film Institute, considered the film to be "one of the best Safety First films for adults".

References

External links
 Worth the Risk? at BFI Screenonline

Public information films
1948 films
British short films
Crown Film Unit films
British black-and-white films
1940s educational films
British educational films